Shimenxian North railway station is a railway station in Dongcheng Development Zone, Shimen County, Changde, Hunan, China on the Jiaozuo–Liuzhou railway and Shimen–Changsha railway. It was built in 1995 and was officially opened in 2013.

History 
The station opened on 1 July 2013.

References 

Railway stations in Hunan
Railway stations in China opened in 2013